The 2009–10 Primera División season (officially the 2009–10 Copa Movilnet for sponsorship reasons) is the 28th professional season of Venezuela's top-flight football league.

Teams

Torneo Apertura
The Torneo Apertura opened the 2009-10 season. It began on August 9, 2009 and finished on December 13, 2009.

Standings

Results

Torneo Clausura
The Torneo Clausura closed the 2009-10 season. It began on January 17, 2010 and finished on May 16, 2010.

Standings

Results

Aggregate table

Serie Final
Deportivo Táchira and Caracas qualified to the Serie Final, which was contested on a home and away basis.

See also
2009–10 in Venezuelan football

External links
FVF's official website 
Season regulations 

Football
2009-10
2009 in South American football leagues
2010 in South American football leagues